2134 Dennispalm, provisional designation  is a main-belt asteroid discovered on December 24, 1976, by Charles T. Kowal at Palomar Observatory.

Photometric observations made in 2003 at the Carbuncle Hill Observatory near Providence, Rhode Island, give a synodic rotation period of 4.114 ± 0.002 hours. The light curve shows a brightness variation of 0.37 ± 0.05 in magnitude.

It is named in honor of C. Dennis Palm (1945–1974), who worked as a night assistant at Caltech's 48" Schmidt telescope on Palomar Mountain in the 1960s and later at Caltech's 60" reflecting telescope, also on Palomar. The official  was published by the Minor Planet Center on 1 July 1979.

References

External links 
 Asteroid Lightcurve Database (LCDB), query form (info )
 Dictionary of Minor Planet Names, Google books
 Asteroids and comets rotation curves, CdR – Observatoire de Genève, Raoul Behrend
 Discovery Circumstances: Numbered Minor Planets (1)-(5000) – Minor Planet Center
 
 

002134
Discoveries by Charles T. Kowal
Named minor planets
002134
19761224